The zero-width space , abbreviated ZWSP, is a non-printing character used in computerized typesetting to indicate word boundaries to text-processing systems in scripts that do not use explicit spacing, or after characters (such as the slash) that are not followed by a visible space but after which there may nevertheless be a line break. It is also used with languages without visible space between words, for example, Japanese. Normally, it is not a visible separation, but it may expand in passages that are fully justified.

Usage 
In HTML pages, the zero-width space can be used to mark a potential line break without hyphenation, as can the HTML element <wbr>; for hyphenated line breaks, a soft hyphen is used. The zero-width space was not supported in some older web browsers.

To show the effect of the zero-width space, the following words have been separated with zero-width spaces:

And the following words are not separated with these spaces:

On browsers supporting zero-width spaces, resizing the window will re-break the first text only at word boundaries, while the second text will not be broken at all.

Prohibited in Domain Names
ICANN rules prohibit domain names from including non-displayed characters such as zero-width space, and most browsers prohibit their use within domain names because they can be used to create a homograph attack, where a malicious URL is visually indistinguishable from a legitimate one.

Encoding 
Contrary to what their names suggest, the character entities &NegativeThickSpace;, &NegativeMediumSpace;, &NegativeThinSpace;, and &NegativeVeryThinSpace; also refer to the zero-width space.

Its semantics and HTML implementation are similar to the soft hyphen, except that soft hyphens display a hyphen character at the point where the line is broken.

See also 
 Hair space
 Whitespace character – including a table comparing various space-like characters
 Word divider
 Word wrapping
 Word joiner (U+2060: ⁠), as well as zero-width no-break space
 Zero-width joiner (U+200D: ‍)
 Zero-width non-joiner (U+200C: ‌)

References

Citations

Sources 

 Unicode Consortium, "Special Areas and Format Characters" (Chapter 16), The Unicode Standard, Version 5.2.
 Victor H. Mair, Yongquan Liu, Characters and computers, IOS Press, 1991.

Control characters
Typography
Unicode formatting code points
Whitespace